The 1973 National Amateur Cup was the 49th annual edition of the national tournament open to amateur soccer teams affiliated with the United States Soccer Football Association.

Eastern Division

Western Division

Grand final

See also
1973 National Challenge Cup

Nat
National Amateur Cup